Sodium molybdate, Na2MoO4, is useful as a source of molybdenum. This white, crystalline salt is often found as the dihydrate, Na2MoO4·2H2O.

The molybdate(VI) anion is tetrahedral. Two sodium cations coordinate with every one anion.

History
Sodium molybdate was first synthesized by the method of hydration. A more convenient synthesis is done by dissolving MoO3 in sodium hydroxide at 50–70 °C and crystallizing the filtered product. The anhydrous salt is prepared by heating to 100 °C.

MoO3 + 2NaOH + H2O → Na2MoO4·2H2O

Uses
The agriculture industry uses 1 million pounds per year as a fertilizer. In particular, its use has been suggested for treatment of whiptail in broccoli and cauliflower in molybdenum-deficient soils. However, care must be taken because at a level of 0.3 ppm sodium molybdate can cause copper deficiencies in animals, particularly cattle.

It is used in industry for corrosion inhibition, as it is a non-oxidizing anodic inhibitor.  The addition of sodium molybdate significantly reduces the nitrite requirement of fluids inhibited with nitrite-amine, and improves the corrosion protection of carboxylate salt fluids. In industrial water treatment applications where galvanic corrosion is a potential due to bimetallic construction, the application of sodium molybdate is preferred over sodium nitrite. Sodium molybdate has the advantage in that the dosing of lower ppm's of molybdate allow for lower conductivity of the circulating water. Sodium molybdate at levels of 50-100 ppm offer the same levels of corrosion inhibition as sodium nitrite at levels of 800+ ppm. By utilizing lower concentrations of sodium molybdate, conductivity is kept at a minimum and thus galvanic corrosion potentials are decreased.

Reactions
When reacted with sodium borohydride, molybdenum is reduced to lower valent molybdenum(IV) oxide:

Na2MoO4 + NaBH4 + 2H2O → NaBO2 + MoO2 + 2NaOH + 3H2

Sodium molybdate reacts with the acids of dithiophosphates:

Na2MoO4 +   → [MoO2(S2P(OR)2)2]
which further reacts to form [MoO3(S2P(OR)2)4].

Safety
Sodium molybdate is incompatible with alkali metals, most common metals and oxidizing agents. It will explode on contact with molten magnesium. It will violently react with interhalogens (e.g., bromine pentafluoride; chlorine trifluoride). Its reaction with hot sodium, potassium or lithium is incandescent.

References

External links

 Linus Pauling Institute page on molybdenum.

Molybdates
Sodium compounds
Dietary minerals
Inorganic compounds
Corrosion inhibitors